Károly Kárpáti (also Károly Kellner, born July 2, 1906 in Eger – September 23, 1996 in Budapest) was a Hungarian Olympic wrestling champion of Jewish heritage.

Career
Károly Kárpáti was born on July 2, 1906 in the Austro-Hungarian Empire. He won a gold medal in 1936 in the Lightweight Freestyle class. The Jewish wrestler's victory in the Berlin 1936 Nazi Olympics provided special significance, because it came at the expense of Germany's vaunted titleholder, Wolfgang Ehrl.  He was one of a number of Jewish athletes who won medals at the Nazi Olympics in Berlin in 1936.

Kárpáti won a silver medal in the Lightweight Freestyle class at the 1932 Summer Olympics in Los Angeles. In 1928 at the Amsterdam Games, he finished fourth in the same weight class.

Kárpáti was Hungary's first "freestyle" wrestler, winning his first Hungarian National Junior title in 1925. He went on to win ten Hungarian National Championships, as well as European Lightweight wrestling crowns in 1927, 1929, 1930, and 1935. He also won one silver and two bronze medals in European Championships competitions during the years in between.

Kárpáti was a Hungarian wrestling master trainer-coach and Olympics coach for many years. He authored six books on the sport of wrestling.

The Hungarian champion listed among his hobbies Einstein's Theory of Relativity. In 1982, International Olympic Committee President Juan Antonio Samaranch presented the bronze medal of the Olympic Order to Kárpáti for his lifelong work with youth in sports education.

The Holocaust
During the years of the Second World War and worsening of the antisemitic policy in Hungary, and the Holocaust, as an Olympic Champion Kárpáti was initially exempt from forced labor camp service or concentration camps to which Jews were sent. Ultimately, however, he was arrested and sent to work on a labor crew in Nadvirna, Poland and in Western Ukraine. He there saw the killing of a fellow inmate, Olympic champion fencer Attila Petschauer, and later recalled: “The guards shouted: ‘You, Olympic fencing medal winner . . . let’s see how you can climb trees.’ It was midwinter and bitter cold, but they ordered him to undress, then climb a tree. The amused guards ordered him to crow like a rooster, and sprayed him with water. Frozen from the water, he died shortly after.”

For the rest of the war he succeeded in hiding in the Banki woods and in Pest with family and friends. Kárpáti died in 1996 at age 90.

See also
List of select Jewish wrestlers

Sources and external links 
on site of Hungarian wrestling with pictures of the sportsman
on the site of the Jewish Sports hall of fame
a site about Jewish sportsmen
on a site of sports

Notes

1906 births
1996 deaths
Sportspeople from Eger
Hungarian Jews
Hungarian wrestlers
Olympic wrestlers of Hungary
Wrestlers at the 1928 Summer Olympics
Wrestlers at the 1932 Summer Olympics
Wrestlers at the 1936 Summer Olympics
Hungarian male sport wrestlers
Olympic gold medalists for Hungary
Olympic silver medalists for Hungary
Recipients of the Olympic Order
Hungarian World War II forced labourers
Olympic medalists in wrestling
Jewish wrestlers
Medalists at the 1936 Summer Olympics
Medalists at the 1932 Summer Olympics